Events from the year 1815 in Denmark.

Incumbents
 Monarch – Frederick VI
 Prime minister – Joachim Godske Moltke

Events
 13 December  The County of Hardenberg Reventlow is established by Christian Henrik August Hardenberg-Reventlow from the manors of af Hardenberg (Krenkerup), Christiansdal, Nielstrup, Rosenlund, Nørregård and Sæbyholm.

Undated

Births
 16 February – Wilhelm Sponneck, nobleman and politician, Danish finance minister (died 1888)
 21 April – Louise Rasmussen, ballet dancer and stage actor (died 1874)
 29 July – Anker Heegaard, businessman (died 1893)
 23 September – Erhardine Adolphine Hansen, actress (died 1893)
 29 December – Hans Jørgen Hammer, painter (died 1882)

Deaths
 15 January  Thomas Bugge, astronomer and surveyor (born 1740)

References

 
1810s in Denmark
Denmark
Years of the 19th century in Denmark